Richard Marian Ogorkiewicz (2 May 1926 – 24 November 2019) was a Polish British engineer and armoured fighting vehicle historian.

Life 
Richard Ogorkiewicz, born Ryszard Marian Ogórkiewicz, was born in Bydgoszcz. He was a son of Polish Colonel Oberst Marian Ogórkiewicz (1898–1962). With the invasion of Germany his family fled first to Romania, then to France in February 1940. In May they went to Scotland, where Richard attended school. Richard studied mechanical engineering at Imperial College London. After completing his studies, Ogorkiewicz continued to teach at Imperial. He then worked at Humber und Ford on gas turbine engines. From 1957 through 1985 he was back at Imperial and concentrated on armoured fighting vehicles. From 1972 to 2006, he was an independent member of various committees of the British Defence Scientific Advisory Council. In 1979 he became a lecturer, and from 1988 a visiting professor at the Royal Military College of Science in Shrivenham. In 1993 he became curator of the Tank Museum in Bovington.

Works 
Richard Ogorkiewicz has published numerous articles in journals, most notably in Jane's International Defence Review.

 Design and Development of Fighting Vehicles, 1968, 
 Thermoplastics: Effects of Processing, 1969, 
 Armoured Forces: A history of Armoured Forces and Their Vehicles, Arms and Armour Press 1970, 
 Engineering Properties of Plastics (Engineering Design Guides), Oxford University Press 1977, 
 Technology of Tanks, Jane's Information Group 1991, 
 Tanks: 100 years of evolution, Osprey Publishing 2015,

References

External links 
 

2019 deaths
1926 births
Alumni of the University of London
Academics of Imperial College London
Military historians
People from Bydgoszcz
Polish engineers